Robert Cummings (born 20 September 1969) is a former Australian rules footballer who played for Fitzroy in the Australian Football League (AFL) in 1990. In 1990 he was selected by Fitzroy with the 15th selection in the 1990 Preseason Draft.

His great-grandfather, Joe Johnson, was a Fitzroy footballer and credited with being the first Indigenous Australian to play in the Victorian Football League. A younger brother, Trent Cummings, also played for Fitzroy and their father, Percy, was a  player.

References

External links

Living people
1969 births
Fitzroy Football Club players
Central District Football Club players
Australian rules footballers from South Australia
Indigenous Australian players of Australian rules football